Thomas Fabian Staley  (August 13, 1935 – March 29, 2022) was an American author, professor, and library director. He was director of the Harry Ransom Center at The University of Texas at Austin. He authored or edited 15 books on literary topics and was the founding editor of the James Joyce Quarterly.

References

1935 births
2022 deaths
Year of birth uncertain
American writers
American academics